Martibel Payano (born August 7, 1988) is an Dominican-American professional wrestler who is currently signed with Impact Wrestling, where she competes under the ring name Marti Belle. She is best known for her time with the National Wrestling Alliance (NWA), where she was a former NWA World Women's Tag Team Champion.  She also competes on the American independent circuit under the ring name for promotions including Evolve, Shimmer Women Athletes, Shine Wrestling and Women Superstars Uncensored (WSU), for which she is a former WSU Spirit Champion and a two–time WSU Tag Team Champion.

Professional wrestling career

Early career (2008–2009) 
On June 12, 2008, Belle debuted for World of Unpredictable Wrestling as Tristan Spade's valet. She made her wrestling debut on November 7, 2009, for World of Unpredictable Wrestling, where she faced Tina San Antonio and Sweet Pea in a match that ended in a triple count-out.

Women Superstars Uncensored (2010–2014) 

Belle debuted for Women Superstars Uncensored on March 6, 2010, teaming with Tina San Antonio in a losing effort to The Boston Shore (Amber and Lexxus). On April 2, Belle competed in the WSU J-Cup Tournament, where she lost in the first round to Brittney Savage. The next day, Belle teamed with Danny Demanto competed in the WSU King & Queen Tournament, losing to Devon Moore and Alicia. On June 26, Belle competed in the Uncensored Rumble III match, which was won by Jazz. On November 26, Belle and Tina San Antonio, collectively known as The Belle Saints, defeated Cindy Rogers and Jana to become the WSU Tag Team Champions, and they would defeat Jamilia Craft and Jennifer Cruz on the same night to retain the titles for the first time. At WSU's 4th Anniversary Show, Belle retained the tag titles with Jazz as her partner replacing Tina (who was injured before the event) in a three-way match against The Soul Sisters (Jana and Luscious Latasha) and The Cosmo Club (Cindy Rogers and Amy Lee). On May 27, Belle lost the championships to The Boston Shore. On April 14, 2012, Belle unsuccessfully challenged Jessicka Havok for the WSU Spirit Championship. On June 16, Belle defeated Havok to win the WSU Spirit Championship. She also competed in the Uncensored Rumble match, which was won by Lexxus. At Full Steam Ahead on October 13, Belle had her first successful title defense against Nikki Addams. Belle had another successful title defense against Ezavel Suena on October 12, 2013, but she would be attacked by Suena after the match, leading Belle to challenge Suena to a Title vs Mask rematch. At Mutiny on February 8, 2014, Belle lost the title to Suena, who later unmasked and revealed herself as the villainous Niya. Belle's reign lasted 602 days, which is the longest in WSU Spirit Championship history.

Independent circuit (2010–present) 
Belle debuted for Evolve on September 8, 2012, in a losing effort to Christina Von Eerie. On December 8, Belle was defeated by Larry Dallas and Papadon in a 2-on-1 handicap match. On November 16, 2012, Belle lost to Niya in her debut for Shine Wrestling. Also in 2012, Belle wrestled for Ring of Honor and Pro Wrestling Syndicate. Belle wrestled a dark match for Shimmer Women Athletes on April 12, 2013, in a 6-person tag team match, and on the following day where she lost to Angelus Layne. She made her televised debut at Shimmer Volume 64 in a losing effort to Christina Von Eerie. She earned her first singles victory with Shimmer on October 18 over Solo Darling.

Total Nonstop Action Wrestling/Impact Wrestling

Knockouts Knockdown (2014) 
Belle initially appeared at the company's appeared at Knockouts Knockdown 2 pay-per-view on May 10, 2014, where she defeated ODB.

The Dollhouse (2015-2016) 
In April 2015, TNA began airing vignettes promoting "The Dollhouse" (Belle and Jade)'s debut, in which Belle's ring name was shortened to Marti Bell. Jade and Bell debuted on the TKO: Night of Knockouts edition of Impact Wrestling on April 24 portraying unstable, childlike characters, where Jade lost to Laura Dennis by disqualification after they attacked referee Brian Stiffler and ring announcer Christy Hemme. Later that night, Jade and Bell helped Taryn Terrell retain her TNA Knockouts Championship against Awesome Kong, with Terrell joining The Dollhouse in the process. The Dollhouse wrestled their first match as a team on the May 8 episode of Impact Wrestling, where they defeated Awesome Kong and Gail Kim in a 3–on–2 handicap match. Bell and Jade would regularly interfere in Terrell's championship matches and ensure the win for her. At Slammiversary XIII, The Dollhouse lost to Awesome Kong and Brooke in another 3-on-2 handicap match. After Terrell lost the TNA Knockouts Championship to Brooke, Bell challenged Brooke for the championship on the July 29 episode of Impact Wrestling, where she lost after a distraction from Gail Kim. On the Turning Point special episode of Impact Wrestling on August 19, Bell and Jade competed in a 2-on-1 handicap six sides of steel cage match against Gail Kim, which Kim would win.

Singles competition (2016–2017) 
In 2016, The Dollhouse  officially disbanded  after the three members turned on each other following Jade winning the Knockouts Championship. At TNA Slammiversary 2016, Marti returned during a TNA Knockouts Championship match involving Jade, Gail Kim and Sienna. Marti ended up hitting Jade in the back with a telescoping baton, costing her the championship to Sienna and starting a program between the two former Dollhouse members. Marti would eventually enter in the Knockouts title scene starting the following month in which she competed on the July 12th live special edition of Impact Wrestling, Destination X, in which she would be involved in a fatal four-way match for the Knockouts title against Jade, Gail Kim, and defending champion Sienna in losing effort; she also debuted a new finisher. Marti would continue to involve herself in the championship scene the following months competing against aforementioned also Madison Rayne, and Allie for the TNA Knockouts Championship; she would also be involved in a gauntlet match on September 15 for which turned to be her final match in the company although she competed against Madison Rayne in a No Disqualification match at One Night Only: September 2016 in a winning effort. at One Night Only: Against All Odds (2016), Belle competed in a Three-way match which was won by Jade.

On January 18, 2017, it was reported that Payano's contract with TNA had expired and that she had left the company.

WWE (2017) 
On July 12, 2017, WrestleTalk TV revealed that Payano and several others will be competing in WWE's upcoming show Mae Young Classic. The following day, she was eliminated from the tournament in the first round by Rachel Evers. She then appeared in a dark match, on July 14, 2017, in a six-woman tag team match teaming with Santana Garrett and Sarah Logan versus Jazzy Gabert, Kay Lee Ray and Tessa Blanchard.

National Wrestling Alliance (2019–2020; 2021) 
On May 12, 2019, Belle returned to ROH where she unsuccessfully challenged Allysin Kay for the NWA World Women's Championship. With National Wrestling Alliance (NWA) producing their weekly internet program, Belle made her debut on the October 22 of episode NWA Power, where she was victorious over Crystal Rose. On the November 5 episode of NWA Power, Belle, who felt disrespected by Kay for saying she isn't ready for the championship, aligned herself with Thunder Rosa by attacking Kay, turning heel in the process. On November 17, 2020, Belle announced her departure from NWA. In August 2021, NWA announced the return of Belle alongside Allysin Kay, going by the team name The Hex, to participate at NWA EmPowerrr, on August 28, in a tournament to crown the new NWA World Women's Tag Team Champions. At the event, The Hex defeated Red Velvet and KiLynn King in a tournament final to win the revived titles.

Return to Impact Wrestling (2023–present) 
On January 20, 2023, Belle alongside Allysin Kay, returned to Impact Wrestling accompanied by Father James Mitchell attacking Rosemary, Jessicka and Taya Valkyrie. At No Surrender, The Hex was unsuccessfully at winning the Impact Knockouts World Tag Team Championship from the The Death Dollz.

Championships and accomplishments 
 American Pro Wrestling Alliance
 APWA World Ladies Championship (1 time)
 Heroes and Legends Wrestling
 HLW Women's Championship (1 time, current)
 National Wrestling Alliance
 NWA World Women's Tag Team Championship (1 time) – with Allysin Kay
 NWA World Women's Tag Team Championship Tournament (2021) – with Allysin Kay
 New York Wrestling Connection
 NYWC Starlet Championship (1 time)
Pro-Wrestling: EVE
 Pro-Wrestling: EVE Tag Team Championship (1 time) – with Allysin Kay
 Pro Wrestling Illustrated
 Ranked No. 32 of the top 50 female wrestlers in the PWI Female 50 in 2016
 Shine Wrestling
 Shine Tag Team Championship (3 times) – with Jayme Jameson (2) and Allysin Kay (1)
 Women Superstars Uncensored
 WSU Tag Team Championship (1 time) – with Jazz and Tina San Antonio
 WSU Spirit Championship (1 time)
 World Class Revolution
 WCR Diamond Division Championship (1 time)

References

External links 
 

1988 births
Living people
American female professional wrestlers
African-American female professional wrestlers
Professional wrestlers from New York City
Dominican Republic female professional wrestlers
21st-century African-American sportspeople
21st-century African-American women
20th-century African-American people
20th-century African-American women
21st-century professional wrestlers